Nicholas Dlamini (born 12 August 1995) is a South African cyclist, who currently rides for UCI WorldTeam .

Career
Growing up in Capricorn Park, Cape Town, Dlamini's first sport was running, which he took up in 2009 along with his twin sister Nikita. In 2011 he took up cycling, initially alongside his running career. He pursued his development at the World Cycling Centre. Dlamini turned professional in 2018: at that year's Tour Down Under, the first UCI World Tour race of his career, he won the King of the Mountains jersey, becoming the first black South African to win a major classification in a World Tour race. In August 2019, he was named in the startlist for the 2019 Vuelta a España.

On 27 December 2019, Dlamini was assaulted by rangers at the Table Mountain National Park where he was training and suffered a broken arm during an altercation.

He was selected to represent South Africa at the 2020 Summer Olympics. He rode in the 2021 Tour de France, becoming the first black South African cyclist to ride the Tour, but was eliminated after finishing outside the time limit on the ninth stage.

Personal life
Dlamini is married and has a son. He is an ambassador for the Elton John AIDS Foundation.

Major results

2013
 African Junior Road Championships
1st  Team time trial
10th Road race
2014
 1st Cape Rouleur
2015
 KZN Autumn Series
1st Mayday Classic
3rd PMB Road Classic
 African Road Championships
2nd  Team time trial
7th Under-23 road race
 2nd Time trial, National Under-23 Road Championships
2016
 9th Piccolo Giro di Lombardia
2017
 1st  Mountains classification, Giro Ciclistico d'Italia
 2nd Time trial, National Under-23 Road Championships
 5th Overall Tour de Hongrie
 6th Gran Premio Industrie del Marmo
2018
 1st  Mountains classification, Tour Down Under
 1st  Mountains classification, Tour of Britain
2019
 5th Road race, National Road Championships
2021
 3rd Road race, National Road Championships

Grand Tour general classification results timeline

Notes

References

External links

1995 births
Living people
South African male cyclists
Sportspeople from Cape Town
Olympic cyclists of South Africa
Cyclists at the 2020 Summer Olympics
20th-century South African people
21st-century South African people